New London Airport  is a public-use airport located six miles (10 km) southwest of the central business district of Forest, a town in Bedford County, Virginia, United States. It is privately owned by Liberty University.

It is a public airport, but usually involves GA aircraft only.  On Sundays during the summer and early fall, the runway is used as a dragstrip.

History 
Originally built in 1957 as a 1/4 mile dragstrip, airport operations were added in 1961 and the facility has served a dual-purpose since. Having been under the continued guidance of Rucker Tibbs, the airport changed hands in December 2005.

Facilities and aircraft 
For the 12-month period ending April 30, 2007, the airport had 28,478 aircraft operations, an average of 78 per day: 98% general aviation and 2% military. There are 76 aircraft based at this airport.

References

External links 
New London Airport, official site
New London Dragstrip, official site

Airports in Virginia
Buildings and structures in Bedford County, Virginia
Transportation in Bedford County, Virginia